Cristtee is a Malaysian skincare brand retailer that specializes in making premium, all-natural skin, hair, and body care products. The company was founded as a handcrafted soap company in 2012, after one of its creators successfully treated one of the elderly in their family who had a rare skin condition with the soap formula they discovered.

In contrast to its market competitors, Cristtee is distinguished for its unorthodox marketing approach, direct interaction with customers, creating awareness, giving out product samples, and minimalist design and packaging.

History

Cristtee was founded in 2012 by a couple, Kean Ong and Shu Chin Ong who live in a city north of Malaysia called Alor Star, in the state of Kedah.  Kean is graduated from University of Arizona, USA with an Architecture Degree. 
In 2010, When one of the elderly in the family had a rare skin hyper-sensitive problem. Kean and Shu Chin were failed to find a suitable soap to ease the condition. Eventually, They took the matter on their hands to find a solution for the cause. After a long effort of learning and testing, they successfully made the first batch of natural soaps suitable for hyper-sensitive skin in summer of 2011.  Within six months, the soap cured the condition. A that moment, they thought the matter has come to an end, thus they were giving away all the remaining soaps and trying to move on with their life. Months after that, they started receiving calls demanding for the soaps. In Spring of 2012, they decided to start a natural skincare company for people dealing with skin's problems and "Cristtee" was founded.

Logo

Cristtee's logo is inspired by ancient Chinese Character {心} (xin1)  means "Hearts" in English. There is a name for the logo is called " The palm of hearts" which was given by their daughter Yu Xuan Ong when she was only six years old.

Cristtee Event

Cristtee Event is a roadshow organized by Cristtee to promote their brand awareness. The event also creates an opportunity for interacts with their customers, educate them the differences between using natural vs commercial products.

Products

Cristtee initially started with handcrafted soaps range. Later, the products started to grow with hair are and skincare series.  In 2016,  essential oils and base oils were added to the product collection. Currently, there are six main categories in Cristtee product family ;
I)   Handcrafted Soaps
II)  Haircare Series
III) Daily Cares Series
IV) Natural Skincare Series
V)  Base Oil Series
VI) Essential Oils Series.

Outlets

In 1st Oct 2015, Cristtee set up its first kiosk outlet at Aman Central Mall, Alor Setar, Kedah, Malaysia. In the following year 1st Dec 2016, its second outlet was opened at Tesco gate, Penang, Malaysia.

References

External links

2012 establishments in Malaysia
Malaysian brands
Cosmetics companies of Malaysia
Cosmetics brands
Skin care